Wang Jinze (born 15 March 1999) is a Chinese footballer who currently plays for Chinese Super League side Shijiazhuang Ever Bright.

Club career
Wang Jinze was born in Xiongyue, Gaizhou (now part of Bayuquan District) and joined Dalian Dongbei Road Elementary School in 2005. He joined Chinese Super League side Guangzhou Evergrande's youth academy from Dalian Shide in 2014. He was then loaned to amateur team Zhuhai Suoka for the 2016 China Amateur Football League. Described as a potentially hot prospect for the future, Wang made a brief trial with Eredivisie side FC Groningen in early 2017. 

Wang was promoted to Guangzhou Evergrande's first team squad in June 2017. He made his senior debut on 22 June 2017 in a 1–0 home win against Hebei China Fortune in the 2017 Chinese FA Cup, coming on as a substitute for Zhang Wenzhao in the 63rd minute. On 11 November 2018, Wang made his league debut in the last match of 2018 season against Tianjin TEDA, coming on for Alan Carvalho in the 82nd minute. He scored his first senior goal in the stoppage time, which ensured Guangzhou's 5–1 victory.

In February 2019, Wang was loaned to China League One side Inner Mongolia Zhongyou for the 2019 season.

Career statistics
.

References

External links
 

1999 births
Living people
Association football forwards
Chinese footballers
Footballers from Liaoning
People from Yingkou
Guangzhou F.C. players
Inner Mongolia Zhongyou F.C. players
Cangzhou Mighty Lions F.C. players
Chinese Super League players
China League One players
China under-20 international footballers
21st-century Chinese people